In computing, bit specification may mean:

 Computer hardware or software capabilities or design features expressed in terms of bit counts. Higher bit specification (e.g. 16-bit vs. 8-bit) usually indicates better performance. Examples:
 Color depth
 Computer bus size
 Processor register size
 Sound quality
 Specification or datasheet where the meaning of individual bits in a larger, for example byte-length, message is described. Bit specifications are often required to document low-level device control or data transmission protocols. See bit manipulation.

See also 
 Functional specification